The Horsemen of Apocalypse are a team of supervillain characters appearing in American comic books published by Marvel Comics.

Publication history
The Horsemen of Apocalypse are first mentioned in X-Factor #10 (Nov. 1986), and make their full appearance in X-Factor #15 (April 1987) where they were created by writer Louise Simonson and artist Walt Simonson.

The first comic-book characters of this name were an unrelated team of aliens from the race known as the Axi-Tun that attacked Earth in ancient and modern times. They appeared in Giant Size Fantastic Four #3 (Nov. 1974).

Fictional biography
The group consists of four individuals (usually mutants) that have been genetically altered and mentally conditioned to serve the ancient mutant, Apocalypse, either willingly or forcibly. They are enhanced or endowed with new abilities, and are always given the same titles based upon the biblical Four Horsemen Death, Famine, Pestilence (replacing the biblical Conquest), and War. While Apocalypse has empowered other individuals to do his bidding, the Four Horsemen remain his elite minions, always playing a key role in his plans.

Before Apocalypse assembled his first modern incarnation (according to date of real world publication) of Horsemen, it was revealed that there were other, lesser known groups of Horsemen.

1st incarnation
The original Four Horsemen were all Apocalypse's biological children, whose names reflected their mutant abilities. Thousands of years ago, they resided on a sentient island called Okkara where mutants have created an advanced society. Okkara was attacked by an enemy wielding the Twilight Sword which divided the sentient island into two creatures, Krakoa and Arakko, and Apocalypse and his first horsemen fought the invaders. Eventually, to stop the onslaught, Arakko and the strongest mutants of the land, including Apocalypse's wife Genesis and the Four Horsemen, went beyond the breach and sealed it from the other side.

11th century incarnation
Having special fondness for the originals, Apocalypse assembled a new incarnation of the Horsemen during the 11th century and sent them to kill a pagan named Folkbern Logan in medieval London. To fill the role of Pestilence, Apocalypse recruited Phantom Bats of the Twelve Minds, a mutant that greatly resembles Orb with his arms replaced by wings which allowed him to fly. For the role of Famine, Apocalypse had chosen a Native American female. For the role of War, Apocalypse had recruited a mutant that resembled a mummy. For the role of Death, Apocalypse recruited a mutant who seemed to possess a gas-like body which allowed him to fly and wears a robe and cloak that covers his entire body like the Grim Reaper. Thor comes to Folkbern's aid and kills the Horsemen of Apocalypse single-handedly.

15th century incarnation
In X-Men: Apocalypse vs. Dracula #1, Apocalypse began assembling a new cadre of Horsemen as he had chosen a new Horseman to fill the position of War. This Horseman led the Riders of the Dark, an army of Apocalyse's followers and rode among them as well. This army was so strong and powerful that some were led to believe that they were just a myth to scare soldiers even before their first battle. Possessing a horse clad in armor that he rode into battle and a pair of battle axes which he could link at the butt and throw, turning them into a sort of bladed boomerang that seemed to return to him, War single-handedly defeated the pre-vampire Dracula's army as well as Dracula himself.

First modern incarnation

Fall of Mutants

In the 20th century, Apocalypse recruits Plague, a member of the Morlocks, during the "Mutant Massacre" to fill the role of Pestilence. He approaches ex-soldier Abraham Lincoln Kieros and grants him the position of War. An anorexic girl named Autumn Rolfson is Apocalypse's third choice and Autumn is given the position of Famine. Apocalypse afterwards saved the de-winged Angel from his sabotaged exploding plane and chooses him to be his fourth and final Horseman, Death.

The Four Horsemen were forced to battle one another for leadership and Death emerges victorious. In their first battle against X-Factor, the Horsemen were nearly defeated until Death appeared, shocking his former comrades. While X-Factor is strapped down, the Four Horsemen are sent out by Apocalypse to destroy New York City. Meanwhile, Caliban confronts Apocalypse and asks for power to avenge his fellow Morlocks.

X-Factor frees themselves and take on the Four Horsemen; Pestilence is accidentally slain by Power Pack in the battle and Archangel comes back to his senses after assuming he killed his former comrade Iceman. Apocalypse retreats with his remaining Horsemen and the newly recruited and powerful Caliban.

X-Cutioner's Song
While Apocalypse heals from his recent defeat on the moon, Mister Sinister disguises himself as Apocalypse and orders the Horsemen War, Famine, and Caliban, who was transformed by Apocalypse and replaced Angel as Death, to capture Jean Grey and Cyclops. The X-Men later defeat the Horsemen when they discover their hideout.

Hulk
After a battle with the X-Men in their mansion, Hulk is taken by Apocalypse and becomes the new incarnation of War, being supplied with weaponry and a helmet that shields Hulk from his father's abusive and severely distracting spirit. Apocalypse set Hulk against the Juggernaut to test the latter's strength. Hulk was able to stop and overcome the Juggernaut, after being empowered by energy from Franklin Richards' "Heroes Reborn" pocket universe. He likewise overloaded the Absorbing Man, but came to his senses after he had injured his friend Rick Jones.

Second incarnation

The Twelve

During "The Twelve" saga, Apocalypse selected a new group of Horsemen to collect the chosen mutants written in Destiny's Diary. This new group featured the cybernetic mutant Ahab as Famine, the Shi'ar Deathbird as War, and the Morlock, Caliban, this time as Pestilence. As the Horseman of Death, Apocalypse had abducted Wolverine and replaced him with a Skrull to prevent his absence being noted. Apocalypse then pitted Wolverine against Sabretooth. The winner of the battle would become his Horseman of Death. Believing himself a better candidate to overcome the programming, Wolverine defeats Sabretooth, and Apocalypse strips the adamantium from the latter and bonds it to Wolverine's skeleton. As Death, Wolverine was sent to destroy the Mannites, a group of artificially-created children, since Apocalypse believed that their presence was a threat to the mutant's existence. He partially destroys a captured Bastion and then attempt to kill the children, but one of the Mannites, Nina was able to request the assistance of the X-Men and after a brief battle, Death kills his Skrull imposter.

When Death captured Mikhail Rasputin and failed to teleport out with him, he was chased into the Morlock Tunnels by the X-Men. He battled them and regained his memory, thanks to the efforts of Jubilee, Shadowcat, Archangel, and Psylocke. The rest of the Horsemen are teleported to another dimension by Mikhail.

Third incarnation

Blood of Apocalypse
Following the House of M and M-Day, Apocalypse resurrected, assembling a new cadre of Horsemen with the purpose of wiping out 90% of the baseline human population. Apocalypse's new Horsemen were Gazer as War, Sunfire as Famine, Polaris as Pestilence, and Gambit as Death.

Gazer was saved from death and forced to battle an archaeologist for the mantle of War, which he won with the aid of Apocalypse's scribe Ozymandias. Both Sunfire, who had lost his legs at the hands of Lady Deathstrike and his powers to Rogue, and Polaris, an M-Day victim, were captured, and reluctantly altered into Famine and Pestilence, respectively. Gambit, however, submitted himself willingly to be transformed into Death, as he had come to believe Apocalypse could be helpful to the mutant cause, though he would need to be watched. Sunfire was able to break free of Apocalypse's control with the help of Emma Frost, although he was weakened by the experience, and Gambit retained a large portion of his former self, stating to Apocalypse, "I'm both Death and Gambit", and he also remembered his love for Rogue as he could not bring himself to kill her. Polaris was knocked out by Iceman in the final battle. She was abandoned, saved by Havok, and freed from her brainwashing by the X-Men. Gazer died defending Apocalypse, having been stabbed in the back by Ozymandias.

The Final Horsemen
When the Clan Akkaba finally resurrects En Sabah Nur, albeit in the form of a child, it is revealed that centuries ago Apocalypse had created the self-proclaimed "Final Horsemen". This cadre of Horsemen had been assembled one by one through time by Apocalypse and Ozymandias and would only be awoken when all other approaches had failed. They comprise the following members:

 Decimus Furius - Collected during the 3rd Century, he is the son of a philosopher that was originally alive in Rome during the 200s. When his father committed suicide and his mother died shortly after, he was left homeless, without any money. While slowly starving to death in an alley, he transformed into his mutant self, the mythological Minotaur. When he was seen, the human civilians attempted to kill him. He slaughtered dozens before being brought down. Eventually, after being imprisoned for years, he was offered freedom, providing he was able to defeat all others in the arena. With his axe, he slaughtered all who opposed him. He was then worshipped as the Dark God Minotaur. He was found by Apocalypse and Ozymandias and he was appointed as War. Along with immense strength and durability, War's axe seems to psionically infect all it touches with a berserker rage and a cold thirst for destruction. His hide seems to have a resemblance to that of stone that makes him look like a statue when not moving. Decimus was later killed by the Apocalypse Twins.
 Sanjar Javeed - Collected during the 4th Century, he is the bastard son and servant of the once king of Persia Shapur II. When the King could not let out that he had this son, Sanjar turned to thievery to get the attention of his father. However, this was when Sanjar's powers developed. He gained an ailment aura that could transmit a spectrum of terminal diseases depending on what variety of metal he touches. He began to poison the entire kingdom by spreading diseases through the stolen treasures. On his deathbed King Shapur named his son "The Seraph of Death". Soon Sanjar was collected by Apocalypse as his horseman, Death. Sanjar was killed by Deathlok while X-Force tried to stop Archangel from destroying the human race.
 Jeb Lee - Collected during the 19th Century, he is a Confederate spy that fought during the American Civil War. He marched behind enemy lines disguised as a Union drummer, gathering information. After the war he returned home, mistakenly wearing his Union uniform. The Confederates believed him to be a traitor and burned his family alive in front of him. This stimulated his latent mutant powers, the ability to use percussive sound to create a bioauditory cancer, a "living sound" that feeds on the flesh of those who hear it. He was approached by Apocalypse and Ozymandias and appointed as Famine. Famine was later captured by X-Force and tortured by Deathlok for many hours while his host took control, revealing the location of Archangel to the team. Wolverine then cut off his hands, effectively removing his ability to use his powers. He later received artificial replacement hands, but was killed by the Apocalypse Twins.
 Ichisumi - Collected during the 19th Century, she's a geisha that first lived in Kumamoto, Japan in the year 1893 AD. Ichisumi was jealous of all the more beautiful and intelligent women around her; as she suffered from a severe inferiority complex. Her father was a samurai who would get mad whenever she would fail. Stemming from her repressed rage and the disapproval of her father, she savagely ravaged the other geisha's after releasing a swarm of "yume beetles" from her mouth. The beetles consume thoughts and memories along with flesh and Ichisumi gains these when the beetles return to her. This is when Ichisumi's powers first manifested leading to her "collection" by Apocalypse, as his Pestilence. Pestilence was later seen in some intimate moments with Archangel who assigned her to guard Psylocke. She was later defeated by Psylocke when she stabbed Ichisumi through the mouth with her own parasol. Pestilence was later revealed to be pregnant with Archangel's child which apparently will be the new Apocalypse. She has since given birth to twins, Eimin and Uriel, known as the Apocalypse Twins.
 Psylocke - Chosen during the 21st Century by Archangel to replace Sanjar Javeed. Archangel used the Celestial tool known as the Death Seed to transform Betsy into the new Horseman of Death but her time as a Horseman lasts only for a very short time since she was freed from Archangel's control by the Jean Grey of Earth-295.

Fifth incarnation

The Four Horsemen of Death
As part of the Marvel NOW! event, a new incarnation of Horsemen of Apocalypse appeared, all dead characters resurrected by the Apocalypse Twins. and sent after a key member of the Avengers Unity Squad that they have some personal ties to. Its members being:

 Banshee - Resurrected by the use of a Death Seed, he was sent after Havok (the brother of his killer Vulcan).
 Daken - Resurrected by the use of a Death Seed, he was naturally sent after his father Wolverine.
 Grim Reaper - Resurrected by the use of a Death Seed, he targeted his brother Wonder Man.
 The Sentry - Resurrected by the use of a Death Seed and was sent after his killer Thor.

Their goal is to destroy Earth and teleport all mutants to Planet X. Although this plan succeeds, the Avengers Unity Squad are able to undo their victory by transferring their minds into the body of their past selves after the Horsemen's victory, providing Rogue with sufficient power to force the Celestial away while her teammates confront Daken, the Reaper and Banshee, while also resulting in Sentry's Horseman programming being broken. While Sentry takes the dead body of the Celestial Executioner into deep space somewhere far away from Earth, Daken and Grim Reaper get away while Banshee ends up in the X-Men's custody as Beast concludes that healing Banshee of the Death Seed energy that made him a Horseman of Death will take years as well as highly advanced technology.

Sixth incarnation

Apocalypse Wars
When Cerebra detected the sudden appearance of six hundred new mutant signatures in Tokyo, Storm sent Colossus and his team of young mutants – composed of Anole, Ernst, Glob, and No-Girl – to investigate, only to learn that the signatures was the work of the Sugar Man who had genetically engineered six hundred mutant embryos in total isolation from the Terrigen Mists and planned to send them to the future, where they would be safe from the M-Pox caused by the Mists and would grow to become the next generation of mutants, with him as their leader. Sugar Man was about to teleport the ark and himself to the future when Colossus and the young X-Men arrived. Their interference resulted in Sugar Man being separated from his ark and their teleportation along the ark to the future. Soon afterwards, the X-Men arrived and, upon discovering what had happened, used Cerebra to track and follow Colossus and his team through the timestream. Arriving a thousand years into Earth's future, the X-Men found themselves in a destroyed New York City. The X-Men soon found their young members, but Colossus wasn't with them anymore, and they were somewhat different as they had arrived some time before Storm's team. They were in possession of the ark containing the mutant embryos and were also protecting it. When the older X-Men asked what had happened to Colossus, Cerebra warned them of the incoming threat: the Horsemen of Apocalypse which was composed of Deadpool, the Venom Symbiote, a female version of Moon Knight and Colossus himself after he had taken the place of Man-Thing.

While several X-Men battled Colossus, Deadpool and the Venom Symbiote, Nightcrawler took Storm to the interior of Apocalypse's Pyramid, only to be ambushed by Moon Knight, but Nightcrawler quickly dealt with her by throwing her into a pit full of spikes they almost fell into while exploring the pyramid. At the top of the pyramid, Storm and Nightcrawler met Apocalypse, who revealed to them that the planet they are on, dubbed Omega World, was his body and him its heart, with his Horsemen functioning like antibodies. Apocalypse also revealed he had already destroyed the ark, which led Nightcrawler to stab him in the back while he fought Storm. With Apocalypse fatally wounded, Omega World started to crumble.

After defeating Deadpool and Venom, the X-Men tried to take Colossus down, but were no match for him. Only Magik, who had just arrived to rescue them, was able to knock Colossus out. Seeing Apocalypse as the only person capable of transforming Colossus back to normal, Storm took him with them back to the present, but he teleported Colossus away as soon as they arrived in X-Haven. Somewhere else, Colossus was found by Clan Akkaba and revealed to be the Horseman of War.<ref>Extraordinary X-Men #12. Marvel Comics.</ref>

Simultaneously in the present, there is a new group of Uncanny X-Men which is led by Magneto and includes Psylocke, Monet St. Croix, a reformed Sabretooth, and a newly re-emergent Archangel who seems to have been rendered a responsively inert drone, though, under Psylocke's psychic leash, Archangel became a heavy hitter in Magneto's X-Men, the group is also secretly backed by Mystique and Fantomex. After investigating a rash of mutant healer murders perpetrated by a long thought dead old foe whose talents had been hired out by an as of yet unknown benefactor, both Magnus and Elizabeth eventually discover a hidden Clan Akkaba base hidden under a religious rally orchestrated by "Angel" (the new person Warren became after being stabbed by the Celestial Life Seed), who in turn was being manipulated by both the clan's lord and the mercenary groups backer Genocide. As it turns out Angel had made a deal with Genocide and the Clan Akkaba to ensure that he would never become the Dark Angel again, and so they were able to split apart Angel from his Archangel persona into separate bodies; however Archangel's mind was altered during the process and, as a result, reduced him to little more than a mindless drone. It is also revealed that Genocide had been using "Angel"'s T.O. infected wings to create an army of clones modeled after his horseman Persona dubbing them his Death-Flight; Techno-Organic winged Archangels to be led by Angel's fused Archangel self in order to raze the world in his pursuit of Darwinism via culling the tainted flesh. Psylocke attacked the Death-Flight to protect the citizens of Green Ridge, and was eventually joined by Fantomex, Mystique and Magneto, who had just killed Genocide. Magneto and Psylocke then watched as Angel and Archangel merged with all their clones to create a new being. This new Archangel was unsure of who or what he now was, but was determined to find out. He swore off all violence and returned with Magneto's X-Men to their base in the Savage Land.

The First incarnation returns
Following the transformation of Krakoa into a sovereign nation-state for mutants, Apocalypse traveled to the island and eventually revealed to those present more of his past history with Krakoa. Later a mysterious island known as Arak Coral appeared off the southern coast of Krakoa and eventually both landmasses merged into one. With Arak Coral came also the High Summoner of Arakko, who was revealed to be the son of Apocalypse's first Horsemen of War. The Summoner pleads to Apocalypse to save them from their enemy and in his efforts to recover Arakko and his horsemen, Apocalypse calls a meeting with his fellows Externals inside the Eternal Caldera on the Arak Coral. Thanks to Rictor, Apocalypse murders Crule, Saul, Nicodemus and Candra. With the aid of Selene, Gideon, and Absalom, Apocalypse sacrificed their corpses to create the Krakoan side of the External Gate. With Excalibur planting the partner Gateway in Otherworld, Apocalypse successfully secured the large gate connecting Krakoa and Otherworld.

X of Swords
Later it is discovered that the first incarnation of the Horsemen are actually the biological children of Apocalypse and his wife Genesis, who was also sent with Arakko. Following that, Apocalypse went to the Summoner and directed him to the portal to Otherworld where he could return to Arakko, while being accompanied by Unus and Banshee. However, what Apocalypse didn't expected was that this was all an elaborated plan created by his own children so they could return and overthrow Krakoa with their fellow Arakki mutants and Daemon army. Apocalypse himself was soon attacked and critically injured by his daughter War, being forced to retreat back to Krakoa to heal their wounds and prepare for war between the two group.

Other versions
Last Horsemen of Apocalypse
During Moira MacTaggert's 9th life, it is revealed that after humanity united with the Sentinels to form the Man-Machine Ascendancy which created an extinction war across planet Earth, Apocalypse leads the last Mutant survivors and chose four of them to be his Last Horsemen which are:

 Wolverine as the Horseman of War, a pureblood mutant, whose mutant healing factor has allowed him to live for centuries.
 Xorn as the Horseman of Death, another pureblood mutant. He has a singularity in his head, which seems to have allowed him to live a longer than normal life, or it could have to do with Apocalypse's genetic modifications.
 North as the Horseman of Pestilence, a "Chimera" mutant which is a hybrid soldier highly effective grown by Mr. Sinister's Mutant breeding program from the X-genes of both Lorna Dane and Emma Frost. North wears a version of Magneto's costume that is green like Lorna's hair and possesses magnetic manipulation powers and telepathy.
 Krakoa/Cypher as the Horseman of Famine, a symbiotic mutant. It is the sentient mutant island living within the body of the former New Mutant. Cypher's mutant power allowed him to read, translate, and interpret any language or means of communication. He had a similar bonding with his fellow New Mutant Warlock, a mutant member of the techno-organic alien race called the Technarchy.

Horsemen of Salvation
A new cadre of Horsemen dubbed as the Horsemen of Salvation has since appeared on Earth Prime and appears to be an inversion of the Horsemen of Apocalypse. While Apocalypse's team has the Horsemen of Death, Famine, Pestilence and War, the Horsemen of Salvation has the Horsemen of Life, Bounty, Wellness and Peace. Likewise, in the same way as the Horsemen of Apocalypse are transformed into monstrous versions of themselves, the Horsemen of Salvation had drastic redesigns involving flowing robes and facial markings, however, these redesigns are later revealed to be psionic ones rather than physical. This team is led by Nate Grey and is formed by:
 Horseman of Peace - Magneto;
 Horseman of Life - Warren Worthington III;
 Horseman of Bounty - Blob;
 Horseman of Wellness - Omega Red

The Horsemen are revealed to be under the mental control of Nate Grey, and when Psylocke was able to release Warren from Nate's control by using her psionic katana, Nate Grey brainwashed Storm into becoming his new Horseman of Life.

Age of Apocalypse

In the alternate reality known as the "Age of Apocalypse", the four Horsemen also existed but did not use any titles, with some exceptions such as Death and War. The only member who was also a Horseman in the main Marvel Universe was Abraham Kieros, also known as War. The first group of Horsemen consisted of Candra, Gideon, Death (an unknown female, speculated to be Selene or Lifeforce), and War. Later members included a never-seen Horseman named Bastion and Maximus as the second Death. Ultimately, Apocalypse announced the War of Succession, a battle between all his Horsemen. The four remaining Horsemen would rule North America alongside him. These four were Holocaust, Mikhail Rasputin, Bastion, and Mister Sinister. It is mentioned that Candra was killed by Holocaust, and Bastion was killed after the war by Abyss, making Abyss the newest horsemen and first recruit after the war. In a flashback, it is revealed that Mikhail was chosen after he defeated War during Apocalypse's attack on Russia.

After the fall of Apocalypse and the ascension of Weapon X as the heir of Apocalypse, a new cadre of Horsemen was chosen, however, the team was renamed as Ministers instead of Horsemen, with Azazel and the resurrected Emplate and the Summers brothers revealed to be among this group, Azazel as the Minister of Death, Emplate as the Minister of Pestilence, Cyclops as the Minister of Famine and Havok as the Minister of War. Each Minister has a special area of control and their own special troops.

Ages of Apocalypse
In one of the alternate realities created by Apocalypse during the "Ages of Apocalypse", Davan Shakari was the Horseman of Death.

Cable & Deadpool
In Cable & Deadpool, the "Enema of the State" story arc, Deadpool went to find the disappeared Cable and was forced to travel to alternate universes in his search. In the first universe, Deadpool found a new group of Horsemen. An eight-armed Spider-Man was Pestilence, Blob was Famine, and Archangel was Death. The three fought Deadpool, Siryn and Cannonball. When Deadpool figured out there was still one more Horseman left, a superpowered Cable (as War, the fourth Horseman) appeared and defeated all of them. Deadpool teleported to another universe when he realized he could not win.

Exiles
One of the original members of the Exiles was Thunderbird of Earth-1100, who was transformed into Apocalypse's Horseman, War. As War, Thunderbird has lost his humanity and sense of taste but had enhanced senses. He managed to break through Apocalypse's mind control and rejoined his allies, the X-Men. When he went into battle-mode, he could even overpower the Hulk.

House of M
When the Scarlet Witch altered reality and created the House of M, Apocalypse was brought back to life. He was a former enemy of Magneto, who became his subordinate, ruling North Africa. Magneto had sent him to kill Black Panther. He went to Wakanda, along with three of his Horsemen shown, Iceman, Angel, and Nightcrawler. Unlike the original continuity, none of the Horsemen were visibly altered or augmented in this reality.

Marvel Mangaverse
In the Marvel Mangaverse comic, Avengers Assemble, Apocalypse was a tokusatsu-esque villain that grew in size and battled with the Iron Avenger (four vehicular machines that can transform together in the form of a giant Iron Man) piloted by the Avengers team (Captain America, Scarlet Witch, Hawkeye, Vision). The Horsemen included Archangel, Juggernaut, Mister Sinister, and the White Queen.

Mutant X
In the Mutant X series, Angel was chosen as Apocalypse's Horseman of Death, but went through a dramatically different transformation with bat-like wings and the ability to breathe fire. To signify his transformation, he changed his name to The Fallen and sided against Apocalypse with Havok's group known as the Six. Eventually his treachery got the best of him and Fallen betrayed his teammates to realign himself with the Horsemen against an evil Professor X. The other Horsemen were all new characters except for War, who resembled Abraham Kieros.

Ultimate Horsemen
In the Ultimate Marvel reality, Sinister is mentioned to be the first Horseman. He is later transformed into Apocalypse after committed several murders on his behalf, only to be defeated by a Phoenix Force empowered Jean Grey. Sinister has since revealed himself since the Ultimatum Wave, and is now, along with Layla Miller, tracking four specific mutants and the White Hot Room. Havok is revealed to be one and it's speculated that Quicksilver is also one of them. Layla also believes that Havok knows the identity of the fourth which indicates they already had found three of them. But since their mission never comes into fruition, as the entire Ultimate Universe came to an end as a consequence of a phenomenon known as an incursion, it remains to be seen, if these four mutants would have any relation to the Horsemen.

Avengers/Alternate Age of Apocalypse
While waging war against Ultron in the near future, Kang accidentally breaks time itself in an attempt to gather an army from various time periods, to aid him in defeating Ultron. As a result of this, an alternate universe version of the "Age of Apocalypse" Apocalypse and his Horsemen ended up in the present day Avengers Tower. A battle ensues between the Avengers and the Horsemen (Spider-Man, Wolverine, Scarlet Witch and Red Hulk, who have been infected with the techno-virus and fused with their mounts). Due to the temporal chaos, the fight ends when the villains are teleported away back into the timestream.

What If...?
 In one alternate reality, Wolverine was turned into the Horseman of War (he was known as Death). He turned against Apocalypse and killed him, then began slaughtering Earth's criminals and villains. Eventually, he became the peaceful Brother Xavier.
 In the reality depicted in What If Legion Had Killed Xavier And Magneto?, the Horsemen of Apocalypse were Storm, Juggernaut, Namor, and Hulk.

X-Men '92
In the final issue of X-Men '92 tying into the 2015 Secret Wars comic book event, Baron Robert Kelly (Baron of Westchester), Bastion, Exodus, and Mystique are revealed as Apocalypse's current Horsemen.

In other media
Television
 The first modern incarnation of the Horsemen of Apocalypse appear in X-Men: The Animated Series, consisting of Autumn Rolfson / Famine, Plague / Pestilence, Abraham Kieros / War, and Archangel / Death. This version of the group were all brainwashed by Apocalypse's subordinate Mystique, who swayed them with the offer of a "mutant cure". Additionally, Fabian Cortez, a follower of Apocalypse, serves as an unofficial fifth Horseman.
 The Horsemen of Apocalypse appear in X-Men: Evolution, consisting of Professor X / Death, Magneto / War, Storm / Famine, and Mystique / Pestilence.

Film
 The original incarnation of the Horsemen of Apocalypse make a cameo appearance in the post-credits scene of X-Men: Days of Future Past.
 Two incarnations of the Horsemen of Apocalypse appear in X-Men: Apocalypse. The original incarnation consists of Pestilence (portrayed by Warren Scherer), who possesses sharpened, animal-like teeth and super-strength; Famine (portrayed by Rochelle Okoye), who possesses pyrokinesis; Death (portrayed by Monique Ganderton), who possesses telekinesis, mind-control, and shield generation; and War (portrayed by Fraser Aitcheson), who can disintegrate skin and muscle. In the present, Apocalypse recruits Storm, Psylocke, Angel, and Magneto.

Video games
 The Horsemen of Apocalypse appear in Marvel Super Heroes vs. Street Fighter, with Cyber-Akuma / Death as a prominent member.
 The Horsemen of Apocalypse appear in X-Men Legends II: Rise of Apocalypse, consisting of Abyss, Mikhail Rasputin, Holocaust, and Archangel. Additionally, statues of the original Horsemen that get brought to life later in the game also appear.
 The Horsemen of Apocalypse appear in Marvel: Avengers Alliance, consisting of X-23 / War, Rogue / Famine, Beast / Pestilence, and Iceman / Death.
 The Horsemen of Apocalypse appear in Marvel Contest of Champions, consisting of Psylocke, Gambit, Wolverine, and Archangel.
 The Horsemen of Apocalypse appear in Marvel Realm of Champions, consisting of Archangel / War, Psylocke / Plague, Magneto / Death, and Storm / Famine. This version of the group each rule over lands named after their Horsemen designation.
 The Horsemen of Apocalypse appear in Marvel Strike Force'', consisting of Archangel / Death, Red Hulk / War, Morgan le Fay / Pestilence, and Rogue / Famine.

References

External links
 Horsemen of Apocalypse at Marvel.com
 AoA Horsemen of Apocalypse at Marvel.com
 Horsemen of Apocalypse at Uncannyxmen.net
 

Villains in animated television series
Characters created by Louise Simonson
Characters created by Walt Simonson
Fictional henchmen
Comic book terrorist organizations
Fictional quartets
Four Horsemen of the Apocalypse in popular culture
Marvel Comics supervillain teams